John Mirak (March 11, 1907–January 31, 2000) was an Armenian-American businessman who owned several car dealerships and automotive businesses in Massachusetts. He and his family are widely known for their contributions to Armenian society in both the diaspora and the republic.

He was born on March 11, 1907, in the city of Arapgir in the Ottoman Empire. He immigrated to the United States in 1920 after becoming an orphan after the Armenian genocide and married Artemis Mirak, also a genocide survivor from Arapgir.

In 1932 he established The Arlington Center Garage and Service Corporation and with the help of his sons. Then, he started Mirak Chevrolet in Arlington, Massachusetts, in 1936. His dealerships later also included Hyundai. Mirak also had a Lincoln-Mercury-Nissan dealership which closed in the 1990s. The Mirak Chevrolet-Hyundai dealership is located at 1125 Massachusetts Ave. in Arlington, Massachusetts. The Mirak Lincoln-Mercury-Nissan dealership was located at 956 Massachusetts Ave. in Arlington, Massachusetts. In the place where Mirak Lincoln-Mercury-Nissan used to be, a business called RCN is in its place.

He died on January 31, 2000, at Lahey Hitchcock Clinic in Burlington, Massachusetts, at the age of 92 of complications from a stroke.

References 
 The Legacy: A Historical Perspective
 Miraks: Featured Supporters of the Armenia Tree Project
 Mirak Automotive Group

1907 births
2000 deaths
American people of Armenian descent
Armenians from the Ottoman Empire
Armenian genocide survivors
Emigrants from the Ottoman Empire to the United States
People from Malatya
People from Arlington, Massachusetts
20th-century American businesspeople